Monga may refer to:

Places
 Monga, New South Wales, Australia
 Monga, Ivory Coast, a village in Lagunes District, Ivory Coast
 Monga National Park, a park near Braidwood, New South Wales, Australia
 Monga River, in Colón Department, Honduras

Other uses
 Monga (Bangladesh), a Bengali term referring to the yearly cyclical phenomenon of poverty and hunger in Bangladesh
 Monga (film), a 2010 Taiwanese gangster film
 Salsa monga, a subgenre of salsa music
 the original name for Wanhua, Taipei, Taiwan

People with the surname
 Ajay Monga, an Indian filmwriter and director
 Guneet Monga, Indian film producer, founder of Sikhya Entertainment
 Sunjoy Monga, Indian wildlife photographer and naturalist
 Vishal Monga, Indian-American electrical engineer

See also
 Mongo (disambiguation)
 Mengxia (disambiguation)
 Mengjia (disambiguation)
 Mongga, a locality on Kolombangara Island, Solomom Islands